The Jammu and Kashmir Legislative Assembly election, 2014 was held in the Indian state of Jammu and Kashmir in five phases from 25 November – 20 December 2014. Voters elected 87 members to the Jammu and Kashmir Legislative Assembly, which ends its six-year term on 19 January 2015. The results were declared on 23 December 2014. Voter-verified paper audit trail (VVPAT) along with EVMs were used in 3 assembly seats out of 87 in Jammu Kashmir elections.

Background and campaign
Before the election, Indian National Congress broke its alliance with Jammu and Kashmir National Conference and contested on all seats in the assembly.

Campaigning before the elections were aggressive and robust. Following the huge victory of Bharatiya Janata Party in the Indian parliamentary election, the BJP turned its attention towards J&K and campaigned on the promise of 'development'. This included a visit from the Prime Minister of India, Narendra Modi in support of the local BJP campaign.

Boycott Calls
Hardline separatist All Parties Hurriyat Conference leader Syed Ali Shah Geelani had appealed to people of Kashmir to boycott the 2014 Jammu and Kashmir Legislative Assembly elections completely, arguing that "India has been holding elections in the Valley using the power of the gun and so such an exercise is not legitimate." He added, "My appeal to the youth, in particular, is that the sacrifices rendered by the people must be safeguarded and, hence, in no way should vote during elections."
Separatists were propagating the poll boycott campaign through video clips on social networking sites and applications, including Facebook and WhatsApp.
A four-minute video clip has gone viral on social sites with messages of chairmen of both hardline and moderate factions of Hurriyat Conference and Dukhtaran-e-Millat chief Asiya Andrabi. The video message sent through WhatsApp and shared on Facebook and Twitter asked the people to boycott the coming polls. 
Video also showed Hurriyat hawk Syed Ali Shah Geelani addressing a gathering via phone urging youth not to undermine the mission of 'martyrs'. Moderate Hurriyat chairman Mirwaiz Umar Farooq is seen posing for the camera with the appeal that polls must be boycotted 'en masse'.

Despite these calls, voter turnout in the 2014 elections instead increased by 4%, from roughly 61% in the previous election to 65%.

Voting
The polls were carried out in five phases. Despite several boycott calls by hurriyat leaders, elections recorded highest voters turnout in last 25 years. Voters turnout was more than 65% which is higher than usual voting percentage in other states of India.

The European Parliament, on the behalf of European Union, welcomed the smooth conduct of the State Legislative Elections in the Jammu and Kashmir. The EU in its message said that, "The high voter turnout figure proves that democracy is firmly rooted in India. The EU would like to congratulate India and its democratic system for conduct of fair elections, unmarred by violence, in the state of Jammu and Kashmir". The European Parliament also takes cognizance of the fact that a large number of Kashmiri voters turned out despite calls for the boycott of elections by certain separatist forces. However, elected Jammu and Kashmir Chief Minister Mufti Muhammad Sayeed said, "If God forbid the Hurriyat and the militants tried to disrupt the elections there would not have been as participative as they had been. They (Pakistan) also allowed these elections to take place." Ruling Party president Mehbooba Mufti also defended Mufti's remarks. While taking a dig at Mufti's statement former Chief minister of Jammu and Kashmir and leader of opposition in Rajya Sabha Ghulam Nabi Azad said that, "In fact, Pakistan and militant groups tried their best to destabilize the democratic process in the state."

Results 

       

|-
! style="background-color:#E9E9E9;text-align:center;" |Party
! style="background-color:#E9E9E9;text-align:center;" |Seats
! style="background-color:#E9E9E9;text-align:center;" |Previously
! style="background-color:#E9E9E9;text-align:center;" |+/–
! style="background-color:#E9E9E9;text-align:center;" |Vote %
! style="background-color:#E9E9E9;text-align:center;" |Vote Share
|-
| style="text-align:left;" |People's Democratic Party
| style="text-align:right;vertical-align:top;" | 28
| style="text-align:right;vertical-align:top;" | 21
| style="text-align:right;vertical-align:top;" | +7
| style="text-align:right;vertical-align:top;" | 22.7%
| style="text-align:right;vertical-align:top;" | 10,92,203
|-
| style="text-align:left;" |Bharatiya Janata Party
| style="text-align:right;vertical-align:top;" | 25
| style="text-align:right;vertical-align:top;" | 11
| style="text-align:right;vertical-align:top;" | +14
| style="text-align:right;vertical-align:top;" | 23.0%
| style="text-align:right;vertical-align:top;" | 11,07,194
|-
| style="text-align:left;" |National Conference
| style="text-align:right;vertical-align:top;" | 15
| style="text-align:right;vertical-align:top;" | 28
| style="text-align:right;vertical-align:top;" | -13
| style="text-align:right;vertical-align:top;" | 20.8%
| style="text-align:right;vertical-align:top;" | 10,00,693
|-
| style="text-align:left;" |Indian National Congress
| style="text-align:right;vertical-align:top;" | 12
| style="text-align:right;vertical-align:top;" | 17
| style="text-align:right;vertical-align:top;" | -5
| style="text-align:right;vertical-align:top;" | 18.0%
| style="text-align:right;vertical-align:top;" | 8,67,883
|-
| style="text-align:left;" |Jammu & Kashmir People's Conference
| style="text-align:right;vertical-align:top;" | 2
| style="text-align:right;vertical-align:top;" | 0
| style="text-align:right;vertical-align:top;" | +2
| style="text-align:right;vertical-align:top;" |1.9% 
| style="text-align:right;vertical-align:top;" |
|-
| style="text-align:left;" |Communist Party of India (Marxist)
| style="text-align:right;vertical-align:top;" | 1
| style="text-align:right;vertical-align:top;" | 1
| style="text-align:right;vertical-align:top;" | 0
| style="text-align:right;vertical-align:top;" | 0.5%
| style="text-align:right;vertical-align:top;" |
|-
| style="text-align:left;" |Jammu and Kashmir People's Democratic Front
| style="text-align:right;vertical-align:top;" | 0
| style="text-align:right;vertical-align:top;" | 0
| style="text-align:right;vertical-align:top;" | 0
| style="text-align:right;vertical-align:top;" | 
| style="text-align:right;vertical-align:top;" |
|-
| style="text-align:left;" |Jammu & Kashmir National Panthers Party
| style="text-align:right;vertical-align:top;" | 0
| style="text-align:right;vertical-align:top;" | 3
| style="text-align:right;vertical-align:top;" | -3
| style="text-align:right;vertical-align:top;" | 
| style="text-align:right;vertical-align:top;" |
|-
| style="text-align:left;" |People's Democratic Front
| style="text-align:right;vertical-align:top;" | 1
| style="text-align:right;vertical-align:top;" | 1
| style="text-align:right;vertical-align:top;" | 0
| style="text-align:right;vertical-align:top;" | -
| style="text-align:right;vertical-align:top;" | -
|-
| style="text-align:left;" |Jammu & Kashmir Democratic Party Nationalist
| style="text-align:right;vertical-align:top;" | 0
| style="text-align:right;vertical-align:top;" | 1
| style="text-align:right;vertical-align:top;" | -1
| style="text-align:right;vertical-align:top;" | %
| style="text-align:right;vertical-align:top;" |
|-
| style="text-align:left;" | Independents
| style="text-align:right;vertical-align:top;" | 3
| style="text-align:right;vertical-align:top;" | 4
| style="text-align:right;vertical-align:top;" | -1
| style="text-align:right;vertical-align:top;" | %
| style="text-align:right;vertical-align:top;" | 
|-
| style="text-align:left;background-color:#E9E9E9" |Total (turnout 65.23%)
! style="text-align:right;background-color:#E9E9E9"| 87
! style="text-align:right;background-color:#E9E9E9"| 87
! style="text-align:right;background-color:#E9E9E9"|  
! style="text-align:right;background-color:#E9E9E9"| -
! style="text-align:right;background-color:#E9E9E9"| -
|-
! colspan="9" |
|-
| style="text-align:left;" colspan="2" |Valid votes
| align="right" |48,17,981 
| align="right" |99.90
| colspan="4" rowspan="5" style="background-color:#E9E9E9"  |
|-
| style="text-align:left;" colspan="2" |Invalid votes
| align="right" |4,795
| align="right" |0.10
|-
| style="text-align:left;" colspan="2" |Votes cast / turnout
| align="right" |48,22,776 
| align="right" |65.91 
|-
| style="text-align:left;" colspan="2" |Abstentions
| align="right" | 24,94,170
| align="right" |34.09
|-
| style="text-align:left;" colspan="2" |Registered voters
| align="right" | 73,16,946 
|colspan="1" style="background-color:#E9E9E9"|
|-
|-
| style="text-align:left;" colspan=12 |Source:Election Commission of India
|}

PDP became the single largest party with 28 seats. BJP became the second largest party with 25 seats.

Omar Abdullah resigned as a chief minister on 24 December 2014.

Elected Members

Government formation 

Three days after the results, the JKNC approached the BJP for a meeting to try and form a government. As part of the deal, Nirmal Kumar Singh was to be the chief minister and JKNC's MLA Ali Mohammad Sagar was to be his deputy. The deal fell through after a revolt in the JKNC. The BJP also rejected this deal, citing morality issues.

In the following days, the JKNC also announced its intention to support the PDP from outside by submitting a letter to the governor Narinder Nath Vohra after the dialogue with the BJP fell through. The PDP refused.

A week after the results, the PDP and the BJP officially started talks. Both parties had a two-member team to form a Common Minimum Programme (CMP). The PDP was represented by Naeem Akhtar and Haseeb Drabu, while Ram Madhav and Nirmal Kumar Singh represented the BJP. Minister of State in the PMO, Jitendra Singh, supervised the dialogue.

Omar Abdullah resigned as chief minister on 24 December. The Governor accepted his resignation but asked him to continue in an interim capacity until the formation of a new government. President's rule was imposed on 1 January 2015.

After dealing with issues, both parties turned their attention to the composition of the cabinet. The PDP was initially reluctant for a three-year rotation of the chief minister's post but later agreed. There were also issues related to the joining of the government by separatist-turned-politician Sajjad Lone. In the run-up to the election, he met Prime Minister Narendra Modi and praised him by calling him "big brother." The BJP reciprocated by not running a candidate against Lone for the Handwara seat, from where he won, and got elected to the assembly for the first time.

Both parties announced on 25 February that the CMP was almost ready, in a joint press conference called by BJP national President Amit Shah and PDP President Mehbooba Mufti. They also stated that the ideological differences had been "ironed out" and both parties were now working on the formation of a cabinet. The dialogue between both parties ended successfully on 18 February - two months and 5 days after the beginning of talks.

The new PDP-BJP government took the oath of office on 1 March in the Zorawar Singh Stadium of Jammu, with Mufti Mohammad Sayeed as chief minister for the full term of six years and Nirmal Kumar Singh as his deputy. Modi was also present for the occasion. Twelve cabinet ministers from each party were also sworn-in. This was the first time that the BJP was a coalition partner in the Jammu and Kashmir government. Lone and independent MLA for Udhampur, Pawan Kumar Gupta, were also sworn-in as cabinet ministers from the BJP's quota.

The CMP was then released in a press conference. The CMP gave a vision of the "all-around development of Jammu and Kashmir" and "Sabka Saath, Sabka Vikas" (with everyone, everyone's development). Contentious issues like Article 370 and AFSPA would be referred to a high-power committee, with representation from both parties and civil society. The PDP also agreed to join the NDA's central, with Mehbooba Mufti's induction into the union cabinet, at a later date, and also support the Modi government in both houses of parliament.

See also
Elections in Jammu and Kashmir
Jammu and Kashmir Legislative Assembly
 Indian Armed Forces and the Jammu and Kashmir Floods, 2014
 2014 Kashmir Valley attacks
 2014 elections in India
 2021 Jammu and Kashmir Legislative Assembly election

References

External links
 Website of the Election Commission of India

2014
2010s in Jammu and Kashmir
2014 State Assembly elections in India
April 2014 events in India